Lolo Yanga Waka (born 23 December 1986) is a South African rugby union footballer. His regular playing position is wing.

References

External links
 
 itsrugby.co.uk profile

Living people
1986 births
South African rugby union players
Rugby union wings
Border Bulldogs players
Griquas (rugby union) players
Sportspeople from Qonce
Rugby union players from the Eastern Cape